Dartchery at the 1968 Summer Paralympics consisted of a mixed pairs event.

Medal summary

References 

 

1968 Summer Paralympics events
1968